Brody is a rural locality (a village) in Frolovskoye Rural Settlement, Permsky District, Perm Krai, Russia. The population was 142 as of 2010. There are 8 streets.

Geography 
Brody is located 19 km southeast of Perm (the district's administrative centre) by road. Sofrony is the nearest rural locality.

References 

Rural localities in Permsky District